Shantytown is a 1943 American crime film directed by Joseph Santley and written by Olive Cooper. The film stars Mary Lee, John Archer, Marjorie Lord, Harry Davenport, Billy Gilbert and Anne Revere. The film was released on April 20, 1943, by Republic Pictures.

Plot
Liz Gorty, the daughter of the owners of a boarding house, takes a liking to a new married mechanic in town, Bill Allen. He gets mixed up with a gang of thieves who force him to drive a getaway car in a robbery. Knowing he has been framed, Bill goes into hiding and Liz uses her job at a radio station to get messages to him.

Cast       
Mary Lee as Elizabeth 'Liz' Gorty
John Archer as Bill Allen
Marjorie Lord as Virginia Allen
Harry Davenport as 'Doc' Herndon
Billy Gilbert as 'Papa' Ferrelli
Anne Revere as Mrs. Gorty
John F. Hamilton as Mr. Gorty
Frank Jenks as 'Whitey'
Cliff Nazarro as 'Shortcake'
Carl Switzer as 'Bindy'
Robert Homans as Dugan
Noel Madison as 'Ace' Lambert
Matty Malneck as Orchestra Leader 
Matty Malneck's Orchestra as Orchestra

References

External links
 

1943 films
1940s English-language films
American crime films
1943 crime films
Republic Pictures films
Films directed by Joseph Santley
American black-and-white films
1940s American films